Misia Soul Jazz Session (stylized as MISIA SOUL JAZZ SESSION) is the second extended play by Japanese singer Misia. It was released on July 26, 2017, through Ariola Japan. The album was entirely produced and arranged by Takuya Kuroda. It features reworked versions of her previous material with a soul-jazz arrangement, as well as two new songs and a cover of Kai Band's "Saigo no Yogisha", from the album Kono Yoru ni Sayonara (1977).

Background and release
The idea of creating a record and holding a joint tour with Kuroda emerged after Misia collaborated with him for the Blue Note Jazz Festival in Japan 2016 tour, where they performed a whole set together with his band. The album mainly focuses on reworking select songs from Misia's catalogue, including the singles "Hi no Ataru Basho", "Believe" and "Orphans no Namida". Misia recorded two new tracks for the album, both written by Kiyoshi and composed by Kenji Hayashida. "Kuruzo Thrilling", a percussion-heavy brazilian jazz-inspired track, features Raúl Midón on the guitar, and on "Unmei Loop", Misia welcomes Marcus Miller, whom she first collaborated with impromptu during the Blue Note Jazz Festival in Japan 2016 concert on the song "Orphans no Namida". The album closes with "Saigo no Yogisha", a cover of the 1977 song by Kai Band. The song was recorded at the demand of Sanma Akashiya, to be used as the theme song to the Netflix original series Jimmy: Aho Mitai na Honma no Hanashi, which he produced. The nine-track EP was issued in Blu-spec CD2 and the limited edition of the album was packaged in digipak format.

Promotion
Starting on July 1, 2017, Misia, Kuroda and his band embarked on the seven-date concert tour Misia Summer Soul Jazz 2017 to promote the album, which culminated with the release of Misia Soul Jazz Session. The new tracks included on the record both received commercial tie-ins: "Unmei Loop" serves as theme song to the Nintendo Switch, PlayStation 4 and Microsoft Windows game Nobunaga's Ambition: Taishi (2017), while "Kuruzo Thrilling" was used by Wowow as its theme song to their 2018 LPGA Tour broadcasts.

Commercial performance
Misia Soul Jazz Session entered the daily Oricon Albums Chart at number 8. It peaked the following day at number 7. The album debuted at number 11 on the weekly Oricon Albums Chart, with sales of 8,000 copies. Misia Soul Jazz Session also debuted on the Billboard Japan Hot Albums chart, at number 14, and on the Top Albums Sales chart, at number 10. The EP charted for nine weeks on the Oricon Albums Chart, selling a reported total of 14,000 copies during its run.

Track listing

Credits and personnel
Personnel
 All vocals – Misia
 Songwriting – Misia, Jun Sasaki, Kiyoshi, Kenji Hayashida, Shirō Sagisu, Satoshi Shimano, Yoshihiro Kai
 Arrangement, production, trumpet – Takuya Kuroda
 Electric keyboard – Takahiro Izumikawa, Takeshi Ohbayashi
 Guitar – Raúl Midón
 Drums – Adam Jackson
 Trombone – Corey King
 Bass – Rashaan Carter, Marcus Miller, Parker McAllister
 Percussions – Keita Ogawa, Adam Jackson
 Tenor sax – Craig Hill, Lucas Pino
 Engineering – Todd Carder, Masahiro Kawaguchi
 Mixing – Masahiro Kawaguchi
 Mastering – Herb Powers Jr.

Charts

Sales

References

External links
 

2017 EPs
Misia EPs
Ariola Japan EPs